Protalebrella is a genus of leafhoppers in the family Cicadellidae. There are about 11 described species in Protalebrella.

Species
These 11 species belong to the genus Protalebrella:
 Protalebrella brasiliensis (Baker, 1899) (Brazilian leafhopper)
 Protalebrella conica (Ruppel & DeLong, 1953)
 Protalebrella iris Young, 1957
 Protalebrella panamensis Young, 1957
 Protalebrella parana Young, 1957
 Protalebrella prima Dworakowska, 1994
 Protalebrella quarta Dworakowska, 1994
 Protalebrella schachovskoyi Torres, 1955
 Protalebrella secunda Dworakowska, 1994
 Protalebrella terminata (Baker, 1899)
 Protalebrella tertia Dworakowska, 1994

References

Further reading

External links

 

Cicadellidae genera
Alebrini